Mah Neshan Rural District is in the Central District of Mahneshan County, Zanjan province, Iran. At the National Census of 2006, its population was 10,168 in 2,308 households. There were 9,866 inhabitants in 2,626 households at the following census of 2011. At the most recent census of 2016, the population of the rural district was 9,604 in 2,867 households. The largest of its 36 villages was Ili Bolagh, with 1,155 people.

References 

Mahneshan County

Rural Districts of Zanjan Province

Populated places in Zanjan Province

Populated places in Mahneshan County